Richard Twiss (11 November 1909 – 1970) was an English footballer who played for Chorley, Wolverhampton Wanderers, Port Vale, and Bournemouth & Boscombe Athletic.

Career
Twiss played for Chorley and Wolverhampton Wanderers, before joining Port Vale in August 1933. His only Second Division appearance came at centre-forward in a 2–1 loss to Hull City at Anlaby Road on 2 April 1934. He was handed a free transfer away from The Old Recreation Ground the following month, at the end of the 1933–34 season. He moved on to Bournemouth & Boscombe Athletic.

Career statistics
Source:

References

1909 births
1970 deaths
People from Ashton-in-Makerfield
English footballers
Association football defenders
Chorley F.C. players
Wolverhampton Wanderers F.C. players
Port Vale F.C. players
AFC Bournemouth players
English Football League players